The 2016 ATP World Tour was the global elite professional tennis circuit organized by the Association of Tennis Professionals (ATP) for the 2016 tennis season. The 2016 ATP World Tour calendar comprised the Grand Slam tournaments (supervised by the International Tennis Federation (ITF)), the ATP World Tour Masters 1000s, the ATP World Tour 500 series, the ATP World Tour 250 series, the Davis Cup (organized by the ITF), and the ATP World Tour Finals. Also included in the 2016 calendar were the tennis events at the 2016 Summer Olympics and Hopman Cup, neither of which distributed ranking points.

Schedule
This is the complete schedule of events on the 2016 calendar, with player progression documented from the quarterfinals stage.

Key

January

February

March

April

May

June

July

August

September

October

November

Statistical information
These tables present the number of singles (S), doubles (D), and mixed doubles (X) titles won by each player and each nation during the season, within all the tournament categories of the 2016 ATP World Tour: the Grand Slam tournaments, the tennis event at the Rio Summer Olympics, the ATP World Tour Finals, the ATP World Tour Masters 1000, the ATP World Tour 500 series, and the ATP World Tour 250 series. The players/nations are sorted by:
 Total number of titles (a doubles title won by two players representing the same nation counts as only one win for the nation);
 Cumulated importance of those titles (one Grand Slam win equals two Masters 1000 wins, one ATP World Tour Finals win equals one-and-a-half Masters 1000 win, one Masters 1000 win equals two 500 events wins, one 500 event win equals two 250 events wins);
 A singles > doubles > mixed doubles hierarchy;
 Alphabetical order (by family names for players).

Key

Titles won by player

Titles won by nation

Titles information
The following players won their first main circuit title in singles, doubles, or mixed doubles:
Singles
 Nick Kyrgios – Marseille (draw)
 Diego Schwartzman – Istanbul (draw)
 Steve Johnson – Nottingham (draw)
 Albert Ramos Viñolas – Båstad (draw)
 Paolo Lorenzi – Kitzbühel (draw)
 Pablo Carreño Busta – Winston-Salem (draw)
 Lucas Pouille – Metz (draw)
 Alexander Zverev – St. Petersburg (draw)
 Karen Khachanov — Chengdu (draw)

Doubles
 Fabrice Martin – Chennai (draw)
 Pablo Carreño Busta – Quito (draw)
 Guillermo Durán – Quito (draw)
 Wesley Koolhof – Sofia (draw)
 Matwé Middelkoop – Sofia (draw)
 Andreas Seppi – Dubai (draw) 
 Julio Peralta – São Paulo (draw) 
 Flavio Cipolla – Istanbul (draw) 
 Dudi Sela – Istanbul (draw) 
 Steve Johnson – Geneva (draw)
 Andrés Molteni – Atlanta (draw)
 Elias Ymer – Stockholm (draw)
 Mikael Ymer – Stockholm (draw)

Mixed doubles
  Henri Kontinen – Wimbledon (draw)
  Mate Pavić – US Open (draw)

The following players defended a main circuit title in singles, doubles, or mixed doubles:
Singles
 Stan Wawrinka – Chennai (draw)
 Viktor Troicki – Sydney (draw)
 Novak Djokovic – Australian Open (draw), Indian Wells (draw), Miami (draw) Richard Gasquet – Montpellier (draw) Víctor Estrella Burgos – Quito (draw) Kei Nishikori – Memphis (draw) Pablo Cuevas – São Paulo (draw) Dominic Thiem – Nice (draw) Nicolas Mahut – 's-Hertogenbosch (draw) Andy Murray – London (draw), Summer Olympics (draw) Tomáš Berdych — Shenzhen (draw)Doubles
 John Peers – Brisbane (draw), Hamburg (draw) Mariusz Fyrstenberg – Memphis (draw) Santiago González – Memphis (draw) Scott Lipsky – Estoril (draw) Pierre-Hugues Herbert – London (draw) Nicolas Mahut – London (draw) Henri Kontinen – St. Petersburg (draw) Łukasz Kubot – Vienna (draw) Marcelo Melo – Vienna (draw)Top 10 entry
The following players entered the top 10 for the first time in their careers:
Singles
 Dominic Thiem (enters at #7 on June 6)

Doubles
 Raven Klaasen (enters at #9 on July 11)
 Feliciano López (enters at #9 on November 7)
 Henri Kontinen (enters at #10 on November 7)

ATP rankings
These are the ATP rankings of the top 20 singles players, doubles players, and the top 10 doubles teams on the ATP Tour, at the current date of the 2016 season.

Singles

Number 1 ranking

Doubles

Number 1 ranking

Best matches by ATPWorldTour.com
Best 5 Grand Slam matches

Best 5 ATP World Tour matches

Prize money leaders

Point distribution

Retirements
Following is a list of notable players (winners of a main tour title, and/or part of the ATP rankings top 100 (singles) or top 50 (doubles) for at least one week) who announced their retirement from professional tennis, became inactive (after not playing for more than 52 weeks), or were permanently banned from playing, during the 2016 season:

 Andreas Beck (born 5 February 1986 in Weingarten, Germany), career-high singles ranking of no. 33, announced his retirement in October 2016.
 Michael Berrer (born 1 July 1980 in Stuttgart, Germany), career-high singles ranking of no. 42, announced his retirement on 10 December 2016.
 Eric Butorac (born 22 May 1981 in Rochester, Massachusetts, United States), career-high doubles ranking of no. 17. He won 18 ATP doubles titles. He announced the 2016 US Open would be his last tournament. 
 Lleyton Hewitt (born 24 February 1981 in Adelaide, Australia), joined the pro tour in 1998, reached a career-high singles ranking of no. 1 on 19 November 2001. He won two Grand Slam singles titles in 2001 US Open and 2002 Wimbledon. On 29 January 2015, he announced the 2016 Australian Open would be his last tournament, although he did come out of retirement to play for Australia for the First Round of Davis Cup World Group at Kooyong in doubles match in March 2016, and he played in the men's doubles at the 2016 Wimbledon Championships.
 Jesse Huta Galung (born 6 October 1985 in Hillegom, Netherlands), career-high singles ranking of no. 91. 
 Rui Machado (born 10 April 1984 in Faro, Portugal), career-high singles ranking of no. 59, announced his retirement on 9 June 2016.
 Julian Reister (born 2 April 1986 in Reinbek, Germany), career-high singles ranking of no. 83.
 Thomas Schoorel (born 8 April 1989 in Amsterdam, Netherlands), career-high singles ranking of no. 94, announced his retirement on 29 June 2016.
 Victor Hănescu (born 21 July 1981 in Bucharest, Romania)'', career-high singles ranking of no. 26.

See also

2016 WTA Tour
2016 ATP Challenger Tour
Association of Tennis Professionals
International Tennis Federation

References

External links
Association of Tennis Professionals (ATP) World Tour official website
International Tennis Federation (ITF) official website

 
ATP World Tour
ATP Tour seasons